My Teacher, Mr. Kim (lit. "Teacher Kim Bong-du") is a 2003 South Korean comedy-drama film about a man's transformation from a flawed scoundrel into a conscientious teacher when he gets transferred to a rural village school.

Plot
Kim Bong-doo is a young teacher in a Seoul elementary school. He comes to school later than the students, and is scolded by the principal every day. Instead of preparing lesson plans, he goes drinking at room salons, and he actively encourages and coaxes parents to give him bribe money in exchange for his favoring their children. But one day, he finally gets caught in the act, and becomes the target of parent complaints.

So Mr. Kim gets temporarily transferred to the boondocks, a branch school in a remote village in Gangwon Province. In the countryside, cell phones are useless and even buying cigarettes at the nearest corner store is out of the question. There are only five students in the whole school, and he's also discontented with the extremely naive villagers who offer him all sorts of vegetables and fruits instead of money. To make matters worse, a grumpy old man named Mr. Choi blackmails him into teaching him the Korean alphabet.

Driven to near insanity by boredom and peace, Mr. Kim maps out a plan to transfer all of his students to Seoul, thereby closing down the rural school. For starters, Mr. Kim begins an after-school program to focus on developing each student's special talents so that they'll want to get a better education in Seoul. Contrary to his bad intentions, this results in a happy, supportive environment for the children and the village community, such that the school officials reconsider their policy of closing down the school because of Mr. Kim's "wonderful devotion" to the kids.

But when a businessman unexpectedly appears, saying he'd like to turn the school into a survival game site, Mr. Kim becomes tempted by money once again.

Cast
 Cha Seung-won as Kim Bong-doo
 Byun Hee-bong as Mr. Choi
 Sung Ji-ru as Chun-shik
 Lee Bom as Choi Ae-soon
 Lee Jae-eung
 Kim Eung-soo as Nam-ok's father
 Lee Jae-gu
 Ku Bon-rim
 Jung Jin-gak as Seoul principal
 Park Soo-il as leisure businessman
 Seo Hee-seung as Gangwon principal

References

External links
  
 
 
 

2003 films
2003 comedy-drama films
South Korean comedy-drama films
Films about educators
Films set in Gangwon Province, South Korea
2000s Korean-language films
2003 comedy films
2003 drama films
2000s South Korean films